Euthymius V was Greek Orthodox Patriarch of Antioch from 1792 to 1813.

References

Literature

External links
 Primates of the Apostolic See of Antioch

Greek Orthodox Patriarchs of Antioch
18th-century religious leaders
19th-century religious leaders